Araeopaschia demotis is a species of snout moth in the genus Araeopaschia. It was described by Edward Meyrick in 1887 and is known from Australia.

References

Moths described in 1887
Epipaschiinae
Moths of Australia